Palm Beach Farms (formerly West Palm Beach Farms) is an unincorporated community in Palm Beach County, Florida, United States. The population is unknown, however. This town is similar to Southwest Ranches because of its semi-rural landscape. The property sizes are mostly an acre large. Major highways throughout the community are SR 80/US 98, Florida's Turnpike, Jog Road, and US 441/SR 7.

Geography
It is located in the middle of the West Palm Beach area.

To the north:Lake Belvedere Estates/Golden Lakes
To the west:Wellington
To the south:Greenacres
To the east:Gun Club Estates

References

Unincorporated communities in Palm Beach County, Florida
Unincorporated communities in Florida